Iris Cantor is a New York City and Los Angeles -based philanthropist, with a primary interest in medicine and the arts. Cited as among the 50 top contributors in the United States, as head of the Iris and B. Gerald Cantor Foundation, her foundation has donated several hundred million dollars to museums, universities and hospitals since 1978.

Early life
Born Iris Bazel (February 14, 1931), the first daughter of Fay and Al Bazel, she grew up in Crown Heights, Brooklyn, New York City. Her mother was originally from Pennsylvania and her father was a Jewish Russian immigrant. Her younger sister Enid was born three years later.

Bernie Cantor

Drawn to Manhattan, she worked as a fashion model and stockbroker before eventually being hired by bond brokerage Cantor Fitzgerald around 1967, as an executive secretary. In 1977, she married the firm's founder and majority owner, Bernard Gerald Cantor. It was her third marriage, and lasted nearly 20 years until his death in 1996. By this time, "Bernie" Cantor had amassed a fortune said to exceed $500 million, receiving $50 million in annual dividends as of 1995.

Subsequent to his business success, Mr. Cantor became a well-regarded art collector, and most notably had acquired over 750 sculptures and drawings by Auguste Rodin, and many American and European masters' paintings.

Iris and B. Gerald Cantor Foundation
In 1978, the year after their union, the Cantors founded the Iris and B. Gerald Cantor Foundation as a vehicle for their philanthropy. In 1996, after acrimonious litigation with her husband's successor, Mrs. Cantor sold her inherited 55% stake to the 170 limited partners of Cantor Fitzgerald, and the company agreed to additionally fund the foundation.

Over the years, the foundation has donated approximately 450 Rodin pieces to museums around the world, with many going to New York's Metropolitan Museum and Brooklyn Museum, Stanford University and the Los Angeles County Museum of Art.

In addition to the artworks, the foundation has financed numerous museum and university expansions:
Metropolitan Museum of Art: the Iris and B. Gerald Cantor Exhibition Hall, the B. Gerald Cantor Sculpture Galleries and the Iris and B. Gerald Cantor Roof Garden, with gifts of $11.5 million (as of 1994).
Brooklyn Museum of Art: the Iris and B. Gerald Cantor Gallery and the Iris and B. Gerald Cantor Auditorium.
Stanford University: 268 Rodin pieces formed the Iris and B. Gerald Cantor Center for Visual Arts, with a $10 million donation in 1994.
Los Angeles County Museum of Art, 114 pieces plus the B. Gerald Cantor Sculpture Garden
New York University's Tisch School of the Arts: Iris and B. Gerald Cantor Film Center, plus permanent scholarship fund, and Faye's Cafe, named in honor of her mother.
College of the Holy Cross - The Iris and B. Gerald Cantor Art Gallery

Since 1995, she has been a trustee of the Metropolitan Museum and the Brooklyn Museum, as well as the Los Angeles County Museum of Art, and North Carolina Museum of Art among others.

She has made additional donations to medical facilities and foundations:
UCLA Health System - Cantor established the Iris-Cantor - UCLA Women's Health Center in 1995. She has been involved with the UCLA Foundation since 1989, and has served  as a Foundation Governor since 2005.
NewYork-Presbyterian/Weill Cornell - donated the funds for eleven birthing rooms, two operating rooms, and a waiting rooms in 1996. She donated $5 million in 2002 to form the Iris Cantor Women's Health Center, and $20 million in 2010, to launch the Iris Cantor Men's Health Center, the Iris and B. Gerald Cantor Ambulatory Surgery Center, and the Iris and B. Gerald Cantor Laboratory for Immunological Research in Diabetes.
Memorial Sloan-Kettering Cancer Center - funded a Senior Chair in 2007.
David Geffen School of Medicine - donated $8 million to improve the school's women's health curriculum.

Cantor has sat on the Board of Trustees of New York-Presbyterian Hospital since 1989. Other board memberships include Exploring the Arts, and the Dean's Committee of the Tisch School of the Arts at New York University.

Awards
Mrs. Cantor has received numerous awards and honorary degrees, including a National Medal of Arts awarded by President Clinton in 1995,. For her work promoting appreciation for the French sculptor Auguste Rodin, she was made a Knight in France's Legion of Honour in 2000, which was upgraded to an Officer on 20 March 2017.

Finances
In 2011, she sold the 34,000 square foot Bel-Air mansion that Bernie had built for her, for a reported $40 million.

References

American art collectors
Philanthropists from New York (state)
Living people
1931 births
American women philanthropists
Women art collectors
Chevaliers of the Légion d'honneur
United States National Medal of Arts recipients
Philanthropists from California
People from Bel Air, Los Angeles
People from Crown Heights, Brooklyn
Female models from New York (state)
American people of Russian-Jewish descent
20th-century American women
20th-century American people
21st-century American women